Edward Fairclough Adams (30 November 1906 – 30 November 1991) was an English professional footballer who played as a goalkeeper between 1927 and 1940.

References

Ted Adams profile at Since 1888 

1906 births
1991 deaths
English footballers
Association football goalkeepers
Liverpool F.C. players
Burscough F.C. players
Connah's Quay & Shotton F.C. players
Barrow A.F.C. players
Wrexham A.F.C. players
Southport F.C. players
Burnley F.C. players
English Football League players
Manchester Central F.C. players